Pachylaelaps regularis is a species of mite in the family Pachylaelapidae.

References

Pachylaelapidae
Articles created by Qbugbot
Animals described in 1920